Qikiqtaryuaq, formerly Fishers Island, is an uninhabited island within the Arctic Archipelago in the Kitikmeot Region, Nunavut. It is located in Bathurst Inlet. Other islands in the vicinity include Iqalulialuk, Qannuyak, Patsy Klengenberg Island, Iglorua Island, and Walrus Island.

References 

Islands of Bathurst Inlet
Uninhabited islands of Kitikmeot Region